Giovanni Boccati or Giovanni di Pier Matteo Boccati (c. 1420 – after 1480) was an Italian painter.

Biography
Boccati was born in Camerino, in the region of Marche. He lived and worked in Camerino, Padua, Perugia, and Urbino. His first documented work is the Madonna del Pergolato (1447); that painting, Madonna dell’Orchestra, and a Pietà (1479) are on display in the Galleria Nazionale dell’Umbria in Perugia. By 1445 he had become a citizen of Perugia.

It is not known where he was trained, but his painting suggests the influences of painters such as Fra Angelico, Filippo Lippi, and Domenico Veneziano.

He painted frescoes in the Palazzo Ducale in Urbino, and an altarpiece (1473) in Orvieto. In 1480, he was paid for two altarpieces in Perugia. He painted a Virgin and Child enthroned, and surrounded by Angels, Seraphim, and Saints (1447) in Perugia. Boccati's "Adoration of the Magi" is found in the Sinebrychoff Art Museum in Helsinki, Finland.

He painted a polyptych (1468) for the main altar of the church of Sant'Eustachio a Belforte del Chienti in the province of Macerata, Marche. The polyptych depicts events in the life, martyrdom, and glory of Saint Eustachius, patron of the town. It also depicts a number of other saints, including the Magdalen, St Barbara, St Agatha, St Venantius, and St Antonio Abate.

References

1420s births
1480s deaths
15th-century Italian painters
Umbrian painters
Gothic painters
Quattrocento painters
Italian male painters